Little Smeaton is a village in North Yorkshire. The population of the village at the 2011 Census was 283. It is next to Kirk Smeaton, and the River Went flows through it. It was historically part of the West Riding of Yorkshire until 1974.

Etymology
The name Smeaton is first attested in the Domesday Book of 1086, in the form Smedetone. This derives from Old English words smiþ (in its genitive plural form smiþa) and tūn ('farm, estate'), and thus once meant 'smiths' farm'. The little element of the name is first attested in Latin translation in forms like smitheton minori and parva smitheton in 1311, and in English in 1315 as litle smitheton. This element was added to the name to distinguish the settlement from nearby Kirk Smeaton.

References

External links
Little Smeaton Parish Council
The Smeaton Villages website
Little Smeaton in the Domesday Book

Villages in North Yorkshire